Port Dickson (Negeri Sembilan Malay: Podeksen,) is a beach resort in Port Dickson District, Negeri Sembilan, Malaysia. It is the second largest urban area in Negeri Sembilan after Seremban, its state capital. The town's administration is run by the Port Dickson Municipal Council (MPPD), formerly known as the Port Dickson District Council from 1 December 1979 until 1 February 2002.

History
The town used to produce charcoal and therefore was called Arang (Malay: "charcoal") - there used to be a carbon mine at the first mile of the coast road (hence named Jalan Pantai) - but it was later developed as a small port by the British during the Straits Settlement period. Port Dickson was also known as Tanjung (Malay: "cape"), alluding to the town centre's location on a small peninsula. The oldest shophouses were the four situated presently at Jalan Lama.

Historically what is today Port Dickson and nearby Lukut were then part of the Luak of Kelang, one of the original nine chiefdoms (luak) that form the first iteration of Negeri Sembilan in 1773.  By early 1800s, it was then part of Selangor. On 30 July 1880, a meeting was held in Singapore between Sultan Abdul Samad (then Sultan of Selangor), Raja Bot (the ruler of Lukut district), Dato' Kelana of Sungai Ujong as well as the British, in which Selangor cedes the district of Lukut to Sungai Ujong (which later became the modern day Negeri Sembilan).

Tin ore was plentiful in Lukut, an area within the Port Dickson district, during the 1820s, and it attracted Chinese immigrant miners. The British considered the area to have great potential as a harbour. It was intended to supersede the port in Pengkalan Kempas. The in-charge officer's name was Dickson, and thereafter the town was named Port Dickson. Others claim that Sir John Frederick Dickson, colonial secretary, a senior official of the Federated Malay States founded Port Dickson and Pulau Arang in 1889.

Port Dickson evolved into a busy trading centre. Railways were constructed to facilitate the growth and development of Port Dickson. Although Port Dickson experienced rapid development, its beaches are fairly well preserved.

Port Dickson is also home to many army camps of the Malaysian Army such as Sebatang Karah, Segenting, Si Rusa and Sunggala.

Economy 
Port Dickson, as a resort town, thrives primarily on tourism. Nevertheless, there are other sectors that contribute to the town's economic growth. Along with Seremban, Port Dickson is part of the 1530 sq km Malaysia Vision Valley, a growth corridor iniatiated by the state government which aims to develop  the western half of Negeri Sembilan to complement the existing development in the neighbouring Klang Valley and the Greater Kuala Lumpur area as a whole.

Oil and gas production

Port Dickson has two refineries which make significant contributions to the local economy. Shell Refining Company has been operating since 1962 while Petron (formerly ExxonMobil Malaysia) operates another refinery which began operation in 1963.

In 2016, Shell Refining Company underwent a transition of its major shareholder. Currently, the majority shareholder is Malaysia Hengyuan International Limited (MHIL) as at 22 December 2016 with an equity stake of 51.02 percent. Shell Refining Company is then changed to Hengyuan Refining Company.

Tourism

Many Singaporeans have invested in holiday homes in and around Port Dickson. Over the years, many hotels and resorts were opened to capitalize on the tourist draw. In the 1990s, Port Dickson boomed with new hotels and resorts being planned and constructed. Due to the Asian financial crisis of 1997, however, many of these projects stalled, leaving many unfinished buildings scattered along the Port Dickson coastline. While some of these half constructed resorts are still abandoned, with the improving economy of the 2000s, many of the projects were eventually revived and completed.

Lukut
Lukut is the northeastern suburb of the Port Dickson town proper. Overall, it has residential, shop units, shopping mall, hotels and tourism attractions.  Some of the attractions in the area include Alive 3D Art Gallery and Wild West Cowboy Indoor Amusement park, 5D cinema, Awake Horror Thrills, Skunk Show, Children Amusement. In 2018, Tasik Villa International Resort, which includes a man-made lake, was launched.

Sailing related
Linking the Indian and Pacific Oceans, the Straits of Malacca is the shortest sea route between three of the world's most populous countries - India, China, and Indonesia. Inspired by the sea trade, ex-pats founded the Royal Port Dickson Yacht Club (RPDYC) in 1927, which still offers dinghy sailing courses and runs regattas. Unknown to most, Malaysia's developmental sailing teams, starting at the Optimist Dinghy level, train in and sail from the RPDYC to the Port Dickson Polytechnic.

The newer five-star Admiral Marina & Leisure Club has good dock facilities for yacht travellers, sailboats and luxury cruisers. It is a transit point for racing sailboats joining the Raja Muda Selangor International Regatta, Royal Langkawi International Regatta and Thailand's Phuket Kings Cup regattas. Admiral Marina also hosted the disabled sailing event of the 2009 ASEAN Para Games and the 2006 FESPIC Games.

Commerce
As of 2016, there around eight shopping centres in the town that serve its population.

One of the largest company originated from Port Dickson is Alpro Pharmacy. It was founded in year 2001 in Port Dickson with its first outlet set up at Oceanic Mall (Currently known as Regina Mall). To date, Alpro Pharmacy has 140 branches in Malaysia and has been awarded by Malaysia Book of Records with ‘The Most Number of Prescription Dispensed by a Community Pharmacy in Malaysia'.

Politics

The town is represented in the Dewan Rakyat of the Malaysian Parliament as the Port Dickson (federal constituency). It is currently represented by Aminuddin Harun of People's Justice Party (PKR).

In turn, Port Dickson contributes five seats to the Negeri Sembilan State Legislative Assembly:

 Lukut;
 Chuah;
 Sri Tanjung;
 Bagan Pinang; and
 Linggi.

Lukut is currently held by Choo Ken Hwa of the Democratic Action Party (DAP); Chuah and Sri Tanjung are held by PKR, and the remaining two seats, Bagan Pinang and Linggi, are currently controlled by United Malays National Organisation (UMNO).

Following a September 2016 re-delineation exercise, the Port Dickson name was used for the whole parliamentary constituency replacing Telok Kemang, while the boundaries remain unchanged.

Transportation

Car
Port Dickson is easily accessible from most major towns of peninsular Malaysia. The Seremban–Port Dickson Highway (operated by PLUS) or the Federal Route 53 connects Port Dickson to Seremban, the state capital.

Federal Route 5 runs through downtown Port Dickson and links it to Malacca and then Johor Bahru due south, or Kuala Langat, Klang or even Ipoh due north.

Public transportation
There were plans to reopen the line for freight and passenger services, but the plan did not see any rebuilding as of 2020. Ultimately, KTMB decided to have the Port Dickson line undergo quiet dismantling works, and in phases starting from July 2022.

Gallery

See also

 Operation Zipper

References

External links
Tourism Malaysia - Port Dickson Beach

List of hotel chalet and homestay in Port Dickson Beach

Port Dickson District
Towns in Negeri Sembilan